Tregrehan is a country house near St. Blazey, Cornwall, designed by George Wightwick. It is described by Nikolaus Pevsner as "Late Georgian ... granite ... Ionic colonnade", [also] "a pretty little lodge".

Tregrehan has been home of the Carlyon family since 1565. During the Middle Ages it was one of the residences of the Bodrugan family. The gardens are listed as nationally outstanding (grade II*).

The spring garden has been restored by the new owner since 1989. Much of the 20 acres is planted as woodland. There is an 18th-century wooded driveway.

References

External links

Tregrehan; Visit Cornwall

Country houses in Cornwall
Gardens in Cornwall